Kimeh (also Romanized as Kīmeh) is a village in Howmeh-ye Gharbi Rural District, in the Central District of Ramhormoz County, Khuzestan Province, Iran. At the 2006 census, its population was 1,648, in 336 families.

References 

Populated places in Ramhormoz County